Lael Chisholm is a New Zealand children's picture book illustrator. She is best known for her illustrations for the Granny McFlitter series written by Heather Haylock.

Biography
Chisholm was educated at Feilding High School, where she was named dux in 2015.
In 2017 she became the youngest person to win the Storylines Gavin Bishop Award for illustration, for her work on Granny McFlitter, the Champion Knitter, written by heather Haylock. In 2021 The Hug Blanket by Chris Gurney, illustrated by Chisholm, was a finalist in the picture book category at the New Zealand Book Awards for Children and Young Adults.

Books
2018 – Granny McFlitter, the Champion Knitter, Heather Haylock, Penguin Random House (illustrator)
2019 – Granny McFlitter: A Country Yarn, Heather Haylock, Penguin Random House (illustrator)
2020 – The Hug Blanket, Chris Gurney, Scholastic New Zealand (illustrator)
2021 – Grandpa Versus Swing, Tania Sickling, Scholastic New Zealand (illustrator)

References

External links
 Lael Chisholm on the Penguin Books New Zealand website
 Lael Chisholm on Instagram
 Interview with Lael Chisholm, Standing Room Only, Radio New Zealand, 2 April 2017

Living people
New Zealand children's book illustrators
New Zealand illustrators
New Zealand women illustrators
People educated at Feilding High School
Year of birth missing (living people)